Domański (feminine Domańska) is a Polish surname, and may refer to:

 Agnieszka Domańska (born 1975), Polish ice dancer
 Bartosz Domański (born 1980), Polish figure skater
 Bolesław Domański (1872-1939), Polish Catholic priest
 Don Domanski (1950-2020), Canadian poet
 Janina Domańska (1913-1995), Polish artist, author and illustrator
 Joanna Domańska (born 1959), Polish classical pianist and music teacher
 Kasia Domanska (born 1972), Polish painter
 Maciej Domański (born 1990), Polish footballer
 Marika Domanski-Lyfors (born 1960), Swedish footballer
 Przemysław Domański (born 1986), Polish figure skater
 Stefan Domański (1904-1961), Polish footballer

Polish-language surnames